Euclera stretchii is a moth of the subfamily Arctiinae first described by Arthur Gardiner Butler in 1876. It is found in Peru, the Amazon region and Uruguay.

References

External links
Original description: The Journal of the Linnean Society of London: 427.

Arctiinae
Moths described in 1876